Berbamine is a calcium channel blocker.

Calcium channel blockers
Phenols
Pyrogallol ethers
Norsalsolinol ethers
Diphenyl ethers